Two Hearts, One Love may refer to:

 "2 Hearts 1 Love", song by 911
 "Two Hearts, One Love", a song by Kenny Rogers on the album What About Me?
 "Two Hearts, One Love", a song by Shania Twain on the album The Complete Limelight Sessions
 "Two Hearts, One Love", a song on Lesley Garrett's album Travelling Light